The Primera División de Fútbol Profesional Clausura 1999 season (officially "Copa Clima Clausura 1999") started on January 10, 1999, and finished on May 30, 1999

The season saw C.D. Luis Ángel Firpo win its 6th league title after a 5-4 penalty victory over FAS in the final after the game was ted at 1-1.

Team information

Personnel and sponsoring

Managerial changes

During the season

League standings

Results

Semifinals 1st Leg

Semifinals 2nd Leg

Final

Champion

Top scorers

List of foreign players in the league
This is a list of foreign players in Clausura 1999. The following players:
have played at least one apetura game for the respective club.
have not been capped for the El Salvador national football team on any level, independently from the birthplace

ADET
 

C.D. Águila
  Marcio Sampaio
  Agnaldo de Oliveira

Alianza F.C.
   Alejandro Curbelo

Arabe Marte
 

Dragon
 

C.D. FAS
  Miguel Mariano
  Jorge Wagner

C.D. Luis Ángel Firpo
  Celio Rodríguez
  Mauricio Dos Santos
  Raul Toro
  Nildeson

Municipal Limeno
 

Santa Clara
  Emiliano Pedrozo

Sonsonate
 

 Player released mid season
  Player injured mid season
 Injury replacement player

External links

Primera División de Fútbol Profesional Clausura seasons
El
1